Weslley Morais Sousa or simply Weslley (born June 7, 1982 in Inhuma, Piauí), is a Brazilian midfielder. He currently plays for Rio Verde.

Honours

Club
 Gama
Brasília State League: 2001
 Brasiliense
Campeonato Brasileiro Série C: 2002
 Atlético Goianiense
Goiás State League: 2007, 2010
Campeonato Brasileiro Série C: 2008
 Santa Cruz
Pernambuco State League: 2011

External links
  Ogol
 

1982 births
Living people
Brazilian footballers
Brazilian expatriate footballers
Sportspeople from Piauí
Santa Cruz Futebol Clube players
Sociedade Esportiva do Gama players
Brasiliense Futebol Clube players
Atlético Clube Goianiense players
Al-Wasl F.C. players
América Futebol Clube (MG) players
UAE Pro League players
Expatriate footballers in the United Arab Emirates
Association football forwards